Nexhati Tafa (born 17 April 1952, in Kavajë) is an Albanian screenwriter, producer and director. He has written screenplays for some of the biggest films Kinostudio Shqipëria e Re has ever produced.

Feature films
  (1994)
  (1993)
  (1992)
 Enigma (1991)
  (1988)
  (1988)
  (1985)
  (1984)
  (1984)
  (1983)
  (1982)
  (1980)
  (1980)
  (1980)
  (1976)
  (1976)

Short films
 
 
  (1990)
  (1988)
  (1986)
  (1982)
  (1976)
  (1976)
  (1976)
  (1975)

Animated films
  (1980)
  (1977)

Documentaries
 
 
 
 
 
  (1997)
  (1981)
  (1977)

References

Living people
Albanian screenwriters
Publishers from Kavajë
1952 births